Heringia salax  (Loew, 1866 ), the Eastern Smoothleg Fly, is a fairly common species of syrphid fly observed in many locations across North America. Hoverflies can remain nearly motionless in flight. The adults are also known as flower flies for they are commonly found on flowers from which they get both energy-giving nectar and protein rich pollen. The larvae are predators on aphids.
.

References

Pipizinae
Articles created by Qbugbot
Insects described in 1866
Taxa named by Hermann Loew
Hoverflies of North America